The Urikhtau gas field is a natural gas field in the Aktobe Region of Kazakhstan. It was discovered in 1983 and developed by KazMunayGas. It has proven reserves of around 1.5 trillion cubic feet (42.2×109m³), with daily production averaging 35 million cubic feet (1×106m³).

References 

Natural gas fields in Kazakhstan
Natural gas fields in the Soviet Union